John William Haigis, Sr. (July 31, 1881 – 1960) was an American newspaper publisher, businessman and politician.  Haigis was the editor and publisher of the Greenfield Recorder. Haigis was the founder of WHAI radio.

Marriage and family
On December 3, 1913, Haigis married Rose Grace Luippold, daughter of Johann Martin Luippold and Elizabeth E. Jacobus, in Montague, Massachusetts.  They had three children Elizabeth Lucretia Haigis, John William Haigis Jr. and Rose Margaret Haigis.

Town of Montague public offices
From 1903 to 1908 Haigis served in various town offices in the Town of Montague, Massachusetts. He successively served in the capacities as the town's Treasurer, Tax Collector, Auditor, Assessor and Water Commissioner.

Massachusetts State offices
Haigis served as a member of the Massachusetts House of Representatives, Massachusetts State Senate, and the Treasurer and Receiver-General of Massachusetts from 1929 to 1931.

In 1934 Haigis was the Republican party nominee for Lieutenant Governor, and in 1936 for the Republican nominee for Governor, he lost both elections.

Haigis also served as a trustee of the University of Massachusetts Amherst from 1940-1956. Haigis Mall on the campus is named for him.

WHAI

On March 1, 1937, Haigis applied to the FCC for a permit to construct a radio station, the application was to construct a radio station in Greenfield that would operate on 1210 kHz, 250 watts power daytime.

Haigis was granted a license for a radio station call sign WHAI.  According to the Springfield (MA) Republican, the station made its debut on March 16, 1938.

In 1938 it was recommended that WHAI be allowed to broadcast on unlimited basis, instead of being restricted to daytime broadcast.

Death and interment
Haigis died in 1960, and was buried in Green River Cemetery, Greenfield, Massachusetts.

See also
 1915 Massachusetts legislature
 1916 Massachusetts legislature
 1923–1924 Massachusetts legislature
 1925–1926 Massachusetts legislature

References

Bibliography
Haigis papers at the University of Massachusetts Amherst.  Includes a biographical note.
A Souvenir of Massachusetts legislators, page 94, (1915).
Who's who in New England By Albert Nelson Marquis, page 494 (1915).
Who's who in state politics, page 170, (1911).
 Who's who in state politics page 75, (1915).

People from Montague, Massachusetts
State treasurers of Massachusetts
Republican Party members of the Massachusetts House of Representatives
Republican Party Massachusetts state senators
American male journalists
1881 births
1960 deaths
20th-century American politicians